The Soldiers and McKinley Memorial Parkways are a pair of historic brick streets in Fremont, Ohio, United States.  Designed as small parkways, they were constructed in honor of Sandusky County's eighty-five soldiers who were killed in action during World War I.  Unlike many similar streets in other cities, they were not built as centerpieces for grand city plans; instead, they were constructed to provide access to a subdivision that had recently been started.

Laid out in the form of a cross, the parkways run for four blocks with vegetation between the lanes for the two directions; they were completed in 1920 after a year of construction.  Historic research has identified both streets as fine examples of the implementation of City Beautiful ideas in an extant city.  Today, the parkways continue to provide access to a residential neighborhood; most of the houses that line the parkways are newer than the streets themselves, having been built primarily between 1930 and 1959.

In 1991, the two parkways were listed together on the National Register of Historic Places, qualifying both because of their importance in community planning and in landscape architecture.

References

Buildings and structures completed in 1920
Buildings and structures in Fremont, Ohio
National Register of Historic Places in Sandusky County, Ohio
Parkways in the United States
Streets in Ohio
Transportation in Sandusky County, Ohio
World War I memorials in the United States
Roads on the National Register of Historic Places in Ohio
Parks on the National Register of Historic Places in Ohio